Fijas is a surname. Notable people with the surname include:

 Piotr Fijas (born 1958), Polish ski jumper
 Tadeusz Fijas (born 1960), Polish ski jumper, brother of Piotr

See also
 

Polish-language surnames